Manju Dey (7 May 1926 — 30 September 1989) was a Bengali actress and director. She received the award for Best Actress in a Supporting Role at the 25th Annual BFJA Awards for the film Carey Saheber Munshi in 1962.

Career
Dey was born in Baharampur, British India in 1926. She first became popular for her acting in Bengali film Jighansa. She was a leading actress in various black and white films in the early 1950s and 1960s. Dey has worked with directors Ajoy Kar, Mrinal Sen, and Tapan Sinha. She also directed and produced films including Shajarur Kanta and Abhishapta Chambal.

Filmography
 Jighansa (1951)
 Biyallish (1951)
 Ratnadeep (1951)
 Kar Pape (1952)
 Bou Thakuranir Haat (1953)
 Grihapravesh (1954)
 Mantra Shakti (1954)
 Upahar (1955)
 Laksha-Hira (1956)
 Kabuliwala (1957)
 Prithibi Amare Chaay (1957)
 Bardidi (1957)
 Neel Akasher Neechey (1958)
 Abhishapta Chambal (1967)
 Shajarur Kanta (1974)
 Arpita (1983)

References

External links
 

Indian film actresses
1926 births
1989 deaths
Actresses in Bengali cinema
Actresses from Kolkata
20th-century Indian actresses